The U.S. state of Wyoming has had a system of direct voting since 1968, when voters adopted a constitutional amendment allowing measures to be placed on the ballot. Only years when ballot measures were on the general election ballot are listed.

Background 
Wyoming's ballot measure procedure has been described by the Initiative & Referendum Institute as "one of the most onerous" in the nation. In order to place a citizen-initiated initiative on the ballot, measure sponsors must gather signatures equal to 15% of ballots cast in the previous election, along with at least 15% of voters in two-thirds of Wyoming counties. These requirements, coupled with the legislature's ability to remove ballot measures if they adopt a substantially similar law, make placing measures on the ballot exceptionally difficult. As a result, most measures voted on in the general election are placed on the ballot by the legislature, not the voters.

There are three types of ballot measures in Wyoming:

 Initiated state statues are measures that would create new state law. They are sponsored by voters and placed on the ballot after meeting signature requirements.
 Legislatively-referred constitutional amendments are changes to the Wyoming Constitution and are automatically placed on the ballot after approval by the legislature.
 Veto referenda are measures to repeal state law. They are sponsored by voters and placed on the ballot after meeting signature requirements.

1968—1999

1968

1970

1972

1974

1976

1978

1980

1982

1984

1986

1988

1990

1992

1994

1996

1998

2000—

2000

2002

2004

2006

2008

2012

2014

2016

2020

2022

See also 

 Elections in Wyoming

Notes

References 

Wyoming law
Wyoming-related lists
Lists of referendums
Wyoming elections